West High School is a public four year high school located in Davenport, Iowa. Their athletic mascot is the Falcon. The school has almost 200 classes, and over 1,600 students. The school, along with Davenport Central and Davenport North, make up the three traditional high schools of the Davenport Community School District (DCSD). West was built in the 1960s and the current principal is Cory Williams.

In addition to portions of Davenport, the school serves Buffalo, Blue Grass, and almost all of Walcott.

Facilities
The school has been undergoing renovations as a part of continued district-wide remodeling after approval of a 1% Local Option Sales Tax, as well as continuing a Physical Plant and Equipment Levy. Science classrooms are set to be remodeled this summer (2007). A YMCA partnered with the school district was built in 2003 attached to the high school. The facility is open to the public as well as providing facilities to P.E. classes. The YMCA took over management and maintenance of the school's swimming pool when it opened.

The school is attached to a YMCA branch with weight room, gymnasium with two full basketball courts, two racquetball courts, and a swimming pool which is available for use by both the public and West gym classes. The swimming pool was existing and taken over by the Y when it was built in 2003.

The school's gymnasium has two full basketball courts as well as a weight training room. The gymnasium floor was recently resurfaced as a part of ongoing renovations.

The school has a practice football field and track on campus along with a separate field used by the band. The school shares district-owned Brady Street Stadium with Davenport Central and North for football and track and field events. Soccer games are held at city-owned Davenport Soccer Complex. Golf meets are held at nearby city-owned Emeis Municipal Golf Course. Baseball and Softball games are held at the district-owned West High Sports Complex, an off campus baseball park that was built as a part of the ongoing renovations district-wide.

The school's cafeteria was remodeled in 2006 to bring it to a style similar to the food court style being used by Davenport North High School, which received national recognition when it was featured on ABC's 20-20. The "Falcon's Perch" features a variety of food choices, a variety of café style beverages, round tables, and automatic compacting trash cans. Members of the school's Student Senate worked with architects toward the end of the previous year to help design the look and feel of the new cafeteria, according to the Beak 'n' Eye, the school newspaper.

The library was moved from the upstairs of the building to the main level into a newly renovated media center in 2001. The new library has four computer labs as well.

The building offices were remodeled in 2001 as well as the main entrance.

Academics
The school offers a number of College Board certified Advanced Placement courses, including AP English, AP Calculus AB, AP Chemistry, and AP Biology.

The school has an average of 20.3 on the ACT exams, below the district average of 21.0.

The school was placed on the Schools in Need of Assistance watch list under the No Child Left Behind Act in 2005. However, scores have risen from 52.6 percent proficiency that year to 67.8 percent proficiency in 2006. Scores are still being analyzed for the 2006-07 school year; however, initial findings show another increase in proficiency.

Athletics
The school participates in the Mississippi Athletic Conference, and athletic teams are known as the Falcons. School colors are red and white.

The school fields athletic teams in 21 sports, including:

 Summer: Baseball, softball.
 Fall: Football, volleyball, girls' swimming, boys' cross country, girls' cross country and boys' golf.
 Winter: Boys' basketball, girls' basketball, wrestling, boys' swimming and boys' and girls' bowling.
 Spring: Boys' track and field, girls' track and field, boys' soccer, girls' soccer, girls' golf, boys' tennis and girls' tennis.

The school also has a cheerleading squad and a competitive dance team.

Davenport West is classified as a 4A school (Iowa's largest 48 schools), according to the Iowa High School Athletic Association and Iowa Girls High School Athletic Union; in sports where there are fewer divisions, the Falcons are always in the largest class (e.g., Class 3A for wrestling, boys soccer, and Class 2A for golf, tennis and girls soccer). The school is a member of the 10-team Mississippi Athletic Conference (known to locals as the MAC), which comprises schools from the Iowa Quad Cities, along with Burlington, Clinton and Muscatine high schools.

Davenport West's biggest rivalries are with intercity rivals Central and North high schools.

Successes
 Baseball (4-time State Champions - 1963, 1965, 1977, 1987) 
 Boys' Basketball (2-time State Champions - 1971, 1994)
 Football (2-time Class 4A State Champions - 1974, 1977)
 Softball (2-time State Champions - 1984, 1986)
 Girls' Track and Field (2-time State Champions - 1976, 1977)
 Volleyball - 1970 State Champions

Publications
Beak 'n' Eye: The school newspaper is the Beak 'n' Eye. It is published monthly during the school year, usually releasing 8 or 9 in a year. Students manage all aspects of the publication. They have a lab area dedicated specifically for the newspaper. The paper is completely digital and is usually 8 to 12 pages.

The Shaheen: The school yearbook is released yearly and generally features a variety of photo spreads, student pictures, and individual club and group photos. The yearbook is also produced by students under an adviser.

The Eyas: The Eyas is West's literary magazine. It generally features a wide variety of writings and artwork. It also has a section reserved for seniors to publish a profile/biography and a picture. It is also released yearly and produced by students under an adviser.

Notable alumni
 Jim Skinner, class of 1962, former CEO of McDonald's 
 James Kibbie, class of 1967, world-renowned organist
 Bill Fennelly, class of 1975, Iowa State University women's basketball coach.
 T. J. Rubley, class of 1987, NFL quarterback, most notably with the Los Angeles Rams, Green Bay Packers and Denver Broncos.
 Kenny Shedd, class of 1989, NFL wide receiver with New York Jets, Chicago Bears, Oakland Raiders and the Washington Redskins.
 Colby Lopez, Class of 2004, Professional wrestler known as Seth Rollins in WWE.

See also
List of high schools in Iowa

References

Schools in Davenport, Iowa
Public high schools in Iowa
1960 establishments in Iowa